The Arckaringa Basin is an endorheic basin in Australia.

The basin surrounds the town of Coober Pedy in northern South Australia. It located in the north of the Gawler Block.

Structure
The basin structure features an elevated central platform. There are both glacigene sediments deposited in the upper Carboniferous and Permian coal measures which are mostly covered by Mesozoic sediments. The Boorthana Formation in the east bears diamictite.

The eastern boundary of the basin contain some outcrops of pavements which prove glaciation.  Infills in the Arckaringa Basin are dominated by mass flow deposits.

Resources

Footnotes

Further reading
 Adam Taylor, "Shale Oil Bonanza Reaches Australia With '$20 Trillion' Discovery," Business Insider, January 24, 2013.

Sedimentary basins of Australia
Geology of South Australia
Energy in South Australia
Far North (South Australia)